Blerim Destani is an Albanian Macedonian actor and producer. He is best known for his roles in Time of the Comet and Dossier K.

Biography 
Destani was born in Stolberg near Aachen, West Germany. He spent his childhood in Tetovo, North Macedonia. His family is Albanian. Destani has lived and worked in Germany and Macedonia for the last ten years.

Career
Full of ambition, he has been pursuing his goal, dedicating his time and energy to the topics of film and acting. At 14 years of age, he made his acting debut in the Albanian TV film Atje ku nuk lind dielli (Where the sun doesn't rise). While producing short documentaries, he began taking acting classes in England.

In 2004, Blerim was offered his first major role in a film. He attracted significant public attention in Southeast Europe by playing the part of the main character "Beni" in the Kosovar TV production Metropolet (director: Sunaj Raca). The action-packed coming-of-age drama Metropolet deals with the fate of the young Albanian boy Beni, who is hoping to attain financial wealth in Germany within a short time. In order to achieve this target, he abandons his family and friends and hooks up with the gangster Musa. However, the plan does not work out and Beni ends up in prison. Reformed by several years' imprisonment, Beni realises that it is not that easy to leave the past behind ...

The successful cooperation with the well-known director Sunaj Raca was continued in 2005 in the motion picture Kosova - Desperate Search. The film recounts the repercussions and effects of the Kosovar war on the Albanian population. Ethnic cleansings and other atrocities mentally and physically destroyed the people. The entwined destinies of individual persons and families from various geographic regions and social classes are the basis of a closely interconnected storyline. Families are not only looking for their missing children, but also for new hope and perspectives. In this film, Blerim very impressively impersonates the complex character of a man who needs to prove his qualities as a soldier, a husband and a father.

However, Blerim is not just an actor - ha takes a broad interest in all aspects of filmmaking and has already gained some experience in the fields of directing and producing. He was the associate producer of the internationally successful Macedonian cinema production The Great Water (directed by Ivo Trajkov) shot in 2004. In 2005, The Great Water was shown at many renowned festivals and received a number of awards.

Blerim is currently continuing his professional training to be an actor by taking elocution lessons in order to further upgrade his abilities and prepare for new international film projects in 2006.

Filmography

References 

Living people
Albanian male actors
1981 births
German people of Albanian descent
German people of Macedonian descent